Could One Imagine?, also released as Love and Lies, is a 1981 Soviet teen drama film directed by Ilya Frez based on the novella by Galina Shcherbakova.

Plot
High school student Katya Shevchenko (Tatyana Aksyuta) moves to a new district and meets classmate Roman Lavochkin (Nikita Mikhaylovsky) at school. Gradually their friendship grows into love, which appears surprisingly strong to the adults around them. Roman's father, Konstantin (Albert Filozov), was in love with Katya's mother, Lyudmila (Irina Miroshnichenko), who eventually rejecting him. Roman's mother, Vera (Lidiya Fedoseyeva-Shukshina), jealous of Katya's mother, hates her and her daughter. Aspiring to separate the children by force, she transfers Roman to another school and forbids them to meet. But love between Katya and Roman does not diminish.

Then Vera deceives her son, forcing him to leave Moscow for Leningrad for a long time to take care of an allegedly sick grandmother (Tatyana Pelttser), who in turn suppresses Katya's attempts to reach Roman or write to him. Katya and Roman are supported only by classmates and teacher Tatyana Nikolaevna (Yelena Solovey), who faces problems in her own personal life. She becomes aware of Vera's deception and tells the truth to Lyudmila and her husband, Vladimir. Katya decides to go to Leningrad and find out everything herself. In the meantime, Roman, who can not understand why Katya does not answer any of his letters (all of Katya's letters are intercepted by his grandmother), calls Tatyana Nikolaevna. She mistakes him for Mikhail (Leonid Filatov), her lover with whom she had a falling-out, and tells him never to call again. Pained and uncertain, Roman accidentally overhears a telephone conversation between his grandmother and his mother, and finds out the truth: the grandmother is not sick at all, and all of this is merely an act to prevent him from seeing Katya any more.

Shocked by the betrayal of those close to him, Roman locks himself in his room. The grandmother tries to reach him. Roman looks out his window and sees Katya, who has come to Leningrad. Roman tries to leave the room, but his grandmother tries to keep him from Katya and her "vicious" family. Roman opens the window and calls to Katya; but he slips on the windowsill and breaks the frame, and falls to the ground. His fall is mitigated by a snowdrift. Katya runs to him and tries to help him stand, but in the end they fall back together into the snow. They are watched by two children, a boy and a girl.

Cast
Tatyana Aksyuta as Katya Shevchenko
Nikita Mikhailovsky as Roman Lavochkin (voiced by Alexander Soloviev)
Yelena Solovey as Tatyana Koltsova, teacher of literature
Irina Miroshnichenko as Lyudmila Sergeevna, Katya's mother
Lidiya Fedoseyeva-Shukshina as Vera Vasilievna Lavochkina, Roman's mother
Albert Filozov as Konstantin Lavochkin, Roman's father
Tatyana Pelttser as Roman's grandmother
Rufina Nifontova as Tatyana Nikolaevna's mother
Yevgeny Gerasimov as Uncle Volodya, Katya's stepfather
Leonid Filatov as Mikhail Slavin, Tatyana Nikolaevna's lover
Vadim Kurkov as Sashka Ramazanov, Roman's classmate
Ekaterina Vasilyeva as Alena Startseva, Roman's classmate
Nina Mazaeva as Maria Alekseevna, the principal of the school
Lyubov Sokolova as Lisa, the postman
Natalia Martinson as Ella, Tatyana Nikolaevna's girlfriend
Lyubov Maikova as laboratory assistant
Alexander Karin as physical education teacher
Valentin Golubenko as furniture carrier
Elena Mayorova as Zoya, Katya's neighbor
Vladimir Prikhodko as taxi driver (voiced by Yuri Sarantsev)
Dmitry Polonsky as classmate in a hat

See also
 One Hundred Days After Childhood (1975)

References

External links
 

1981 films
1981 romantic drama films
1980s teen drama films
Films directed by Ilya Frez
Russian teen drama films
Soviet teen drama films
Films set in Moscow
Films set in Saint Petersburg